Middle Valley may refer to:

 Middle Valley, New Zealand, a locality in the Mackenzie District
 Middle Valley, New Jersey, United States
 Middle Valley, Tennessee, United States